Prachi Yadav (born 29 May 1995 in Gwalior) is an Indian Paracanoe Athlete who participated in 2020 Tokyo Paralympics. Prachi Yadav created history by winning bronze medal in Paralympic World Cup, became the first player to win medal in Canoe.

In the 2022 ICF Canoe Sprint World Championships, Prachi Yadav made it to the top 10 in 1:11.15 minutes while staying inside the Women's VL2, Earlier Paracanoeing at the 2020 Summer Paralympics – Women's VL2 – Women's VL2 recorded its place in 11.098 minutes and reached the finals in 2019 ICF Canoe Sprint World Championships – Women's VL2, winning in 16:35 minutes.

About 

Prachi Yadav was born on 29 May 1995 in Gwalior, Madhya Pradesh, India. Her father Jagdish Singh Yadav was a retired Deputy Director in Agriculture Department and her Mother Chandra Kumari Yadav died of cancer in 2003. She is married to Manish Kaurav, who is a Para Canoeist. She has also participated in Para Swimming nationals.

Career 
She started her Para Canoe career in 2018 switching from Para swimming on the recommendation of her coach Virender Kumar Dabas. She trains at Lower Lake in Bhopal, India. She reached the finals with her outstanding performance in the Women's Va'a Single 200m canoe sprint and finished 8th with a timing of 1:07.329.

2020 Summer Paralympics

Prachi becomes First-ever Indian Paracanoe Athlete To Qualify For Paracanoe at the 2020 Summer Paralympics Paralympics Games at Tokyo, Japan

Tournaments record

Awards 
 2020: Vikram Award by Government of Madhya Pradesh on National Sports Day.

References

External links 

 Canoe Sprint YADAV Prachi - Tokyo 2020 Paralympics
 Tokyo Paralympics: Prachi Yadav finishes 8th in the final of women's canoe sprint
 2021 Paralympics: Prachi Yadav finishes 8th in women's Va'a singles 200m VL2 Canoe sprint final
 Para Athlete Prachi Yadav Biography, Boyfriend, Income, Unknown Facts
 Qualification done, Prachi Yadav eyes Target Olympic Podium Scheme & exposure trip

1995 births
Living people